The Assa are an ethnic group based on the Maasai Steppe in Manyara Region, Tanzania. In 1999, they were estimated to number around 300 individuals, after the eastern Assa were assimilated into the Maasai. The Assa once spoke the Aasáx language, ambiguously called "Dorobo", which probably belonged to the Afro-Asiatic language family,

See also
 List of ethnic groups in Tanzania
 Manyara Region

References

Ethnic groups in Tanzania
Indigenous peoples of East Africa
Cushitic-speaking peoples